Jacquelynne Sue Eccles (born 1944) is an American educational psychologist. She is the Distinguished Professor of Education at the University of California, Irvine and formerly the McKeachie/Pintrich Distinguished University Professor of Psychology and Education at the University of Michigan.

Career 
Eccles holds a Ph.D. from University of California, Los Angeles. Her work has focused on topics related to social development, student motivation, and gender roles in education. Among her most noteworthy research contributions are the expectancy-value theory of motivation and the concept of stage-environment fit.

Honors and awards
She received the Kurt Lewin Memorial Award in 1999, the James McKeen Cattell Fellow Award in 1996 and the E. L. Thorndike Award in 2005. She was awarded the APA Distinguished Scientific Award for the Applications of Psychology from the American Psychological Association in 2017.

Selected publications 
 Eccles, J. S., Midgley, C., Wigfield, A., Buchanan, C. M., Reuman, D., Flanagan, C., & Mac Iver, D. (1993). "Development during adolescence: The impact of stage-environment fit on young adolescents' experiences in schools and in families". American Psychologist, 48(2), 90.
 Eccles, J. S., & Barber, B. L. (1999). "Student council, volunteering, basketball, or marching band what kind of extracurricular involvement matters?". Journal of Adolescent Research, 14(1), 10–43.
 Wigfield, A., & Eccles, J. S. (2000). "Expectancy–value theory of achievement motivation". Contemporary Educational Psychology, 25(1), 68–81.
 Eccles, J. S., & Wigfield, A. (2002). "Motivational beliefs, values, and goals". Annual Review of Psychology, 53(1), 109–132.

References 

University of Michigan faculty
American women psychologists
21st-century American psychologists
1944 births
Living people
University of California, Los Angeles alumni
American women academics
21st-century American women
20th-century American psychologists